OmniFaces is an open source utility library for the JavaServer Faces 2 framework. It was developed using the JSF API, and its aim is to make JSF life easier by providing a set of artifacts meant to improve the functionality of the JSF framework. Omnifaces was created in response to seeing the same questions and the same example and utility code posted over and over again. It simply comes as an answer to day-by-day problems encountered during working with JSF (e.g. bug fixing, pitfalls, missing features, missing utilities, common questions, etc.). Many of these problems were collected from StackOverflow.

OmniFaces was developed by two members of the JSF Expert Group (JSF EG), Bauke Scholtz (aka BalusC) and Arjan Tijms.

OmniFaces can be used in both JSF implementations, Mojarra and Apache MyFaces, and is intended to work in cooperation with existing JSF libraries, like PrimeFaces, OpenFaces, ICEfaces, MyFaces Trinidad, etc.

History 
The OmniFaces project started on 1 March 2012.  The latest release is OmniFaces 3.0 (released on 3 January 2018).

Release history

See also 
Other JSF libraries:
 PrimeFaces
 RichFaces
 ICEfaces
 OpenFaces
 Apache MyFaces
 * Tobago
 * Tomahawk
 Trinidad
 ADF Faces
 PrettyFaces

References

External links 
 
 OmniFaces ZEEF page

Jakarta Server Faces